Gary and His Demons is a Canadian adult animated sitcom created by Mark Little and co-created by Mark Satterthwaite for Mondo Media's channel on VRV. The series follows a cantankerous, aging demon slayer who has nothing left to lose. Burdened by his “Chosen One” status and backed by a team of specialists he can't relate to, Gary struggles to keep interest in the Earth-saving duty he never asked for and doesn't want.

The first season is directed by Mark Little and Louis Solis, and is primarily written by Little and Stephanie Kaliner. The voice cast includes Little as Gary, Kayla Lorette as Leslie, Kyle Dooley as Hanley, Marito Lopez as Marito, and Miguel Rivas in various roles.

On April 13, 2022, it was announced there will be a second season and the series will move to Amazon Prime Video. Season 2 was released on October 6th, 2022 for some locations.

Premise 
The series opens on aging Gary as he chases what he thinks is his last demon. After a disappointing failed capture resulting in him injuring an innocent homeless boy, Gary returns to the Demon Ministry to attend his own retirement party - his second retirement party in thirty years since Chosen One status is only meant to last fifteen years. Shortly after an underwhelming retirement speech his boss, Leslie, reveals to him that they've once again failed to find his replacement, and she asks him to serve one more term as Chosen One - which would mean fighting until he turns 60. The show revolves around Gary's adventures in demon hunting while also dealing with the frustration of being unable to retire.

Production

Improvisation 
Improvisation plays a heavy role in recording the show, and the final product is a marriage of the script and improvisation. The creative team has said that they include as many improvisers in recording as possible.

Animation 
Animation director Louis Solis has said that the team used Flash to animate the show, saying that it provides the best way to capture the improvisational spirit of the show.

Episodes

Release 

The first season was streamed weekly on VRV in the United States between April 15 and August 26, 2018. The show had its linear television debut on April 20, 2019 on Syfy as part of its TZGZ block. It was also aired on El Rey Network as part of the Mondo Animation Hour.

In Canada, the series was streamed on CBC Gem in October 2018. That same month, Comedy Central began airing the series in the United Kingdom. In Australia, the series was added to ABC iView in November 2018 and premiered on ABC Comedy.

References 

2010s Canadian adult animated television series
2010s Canadian comedy-drama television series
2010s Canadian sitcoms
2018 Canadian television series debuts
Canadian adult animated comedy television series
Canadian adult animated drama television series
Canadian animated sitcoms
Canadian comedy web series
CBC Gem original programming
Television series by Blue Ant Studios